, known professionally as Yuki (stylized as YUKI), is a Japanese musician and singer-songwriter. She is best known as the lead vocalist for Judy and Mary. She founded Judy and Mary in 1991 and became a solo artist in 2002. She has also been a member of the bands NiNa (1999, with Kate Pierson of the B-52's, bassist Mick Karn of Japan, former members of the Japanese New Wave band the Plastics Masahide Sakuma and Takemi Shima, and session drummer Steven Wolf) and Mean Machine (alongside Chara, 2001).

Biography
Yuki was born  in Hakodate, Hokkaido. After graduating from Hakodate Otani College, she worked as a beautician. She met Yoshihito Onda who visited Hakodate to make a movie, The Triple Cross. The meeting triggered the formation of Judy and Mary in 1992. After Judy and Mary disbanded, Yuki made her solo debut in 2002. She married Magokoro Brothers frontman Yoichi Kuramochi in September 2000, and gave birth to her first child, a boy, on April 18, 2003. However, the child died from unknown causes (SIDS) on March 17, 2005. She gave birth to a second child on August 29, 2006, and a third child in June 2009.

Backup band

Band Astro 
They perform in her tour or recording.
 Guitar: Jun Matsue (Spoozys)
 Drums: Atsushi Matsushita (Zazen Boys)
  Bass: Hiroharu Kinoshita  (ex. L⇔R, curve509)
  All keyboard instruments: Makoto Minagawa (ex Shiina Ringo)
  DJ / manipulator: Yohei Tsukasaki

The Urah 
They performed in her tour or recording in 2010.
  All keyboard instruments: Kiyohide Ura (ex Diamond Head)
 Guitar: Tsuneo Imahori
 Guitar: Akihito "Akkin" Suzuki (ex. Heart Bazaar, ex Shiina Ringo, ex Kaela Kimura)
  Bass: Kenji Ueda (ex. The Pillows)
 Drums: Tsuyoshi Miyagawa

Discography

Original albums

Other albums

Singles

As lead artist 

*charted on monthly Chaku-uta Reco-kyō Chart†Japan Hot 100 established February 2008, RIAJ Digital Track Chart established April 2009

As featured artist

DVDs
  (March 2, 2005)
 Sweet Home Rock'n Roll Tour (March 2, 2005)
  (January 25, 2006)
  (March 19, 2008)
 Yuki Live "5-star": The Gift Will Suddenly Arrive (May 28, 2008)
 Yuki concert New Rhythm Tour 2008 (March 4, 2009)

Books
 Yuki Girly Rock – Yuki biography (1997)
 Yuki Girly Swing – Yuki autobiography & diary (1997)
 Yuki Girly Folk – Yuki biography (2000)
 Yuki Girly Boogie – Yuki autobiography & diary (2000)
 Yuki Girly Wave – Yuki biography (2004)
 Yuki Girly Tree – Yuki autobiography & diary (2004)

Appearances

Movies
  – cameo appearance

Radio
Yuki: Hello! New World (2017–present)

References

Further reading

External links
 YUKI Instagram – By Instagram
YUKI Official Website – By Sony Music

1972 births
Living people
Japanese women singer-songwriters
Japanese women pop singers
Mean Machine (band) members
Musicians from Hokkaido
People from Hakodate
Sony Music Entertainment Japan artists
20th-century Japanese women singers
20th-century Japanese singers
21st-century Japanese women singers
21st-century Japanese singers